World Beyond War (distinct from Beyond War) is an anti-war organization with chapters and affiliates in about two dozen countries. The organization bills itself as "a global nonviolent movement to end war and establish a just and sustainable peace." It is opposed to the very institution of war and not just individual wars. World Beyond War pursues the abolition of war through regional organizing along with global campaigns to close military bases and divest from corporations that profit from war and weapon sales.

The organization was founded in January 2014 by David Swanson, Leah Bolger and David Hartsough. The global organization is headquartered in Chartlottesville, Virginia. World Beyond War is a grassroots organization funded by small donors. The nonprofit organization is a fiscal affiliate of Alliance for Global Justice.

World Beyond War publishes books, maintains a speakers bureau, funds the installation of billboards, hosts conferences, organizes protests, and produces webinars. Its book, A Global Security System: An Alternative to War, has been updated and published annually since 2015.

Leadership

Board of directors

Advisory board

Staff

Activities

World Beyond War hosts a global peace conference that gathers hundreds of activists every year. #NoWar2020 was scheduled for Ottawa, Canada, and will now take place online. #NoWar2019 was in Limerick, Ireland. #NoWar2018 was in Toronto, Canada. Previous annual conferences were in Washington, DC.

World Beyond War promotes peace education programs and runs online courses in war abolition and peace activism. The organization also produces frequent webinars and other online events that are then made available for free on video. The "World Beyond War" podcast launched in January 2019 and has featured interviews with peace activists in Vietnam, Bolivia, Iran, Venezuela, Cyprus, Japan, US, England, New Zealand, Canada, Ireland, Italy.

Publications and coverage

World Beyond War has gotten coverage by the Cato Institute, Scientific American, Truthdig, Common Dreams, and Catholic Sentinel.

In 2020, Milwaukee congresswoman Gwen Moore referred to US military budget as a "feeding frenzy" at an event featuring World Beyond War's billboard in Milwaukee, which read "3% of US military spending could end starvation on earth." This was covered in Urban Milwaukee.

World Beyond War initiated a letter-writing campaign for the cancellation of Canada's annual weapons expo, CANSEC, which was scheduled to take place in Ottawa, Canada in May, 2020 despite the coronavirus pandemic. This campaign was eventually credited with helping to force the decision to cancel.

World Beyond War alternates global organizing activity with regional events, such as an April 2020 webinar on military bases in Guam.

World Beyond War has gotten coverage for its campaigns in Democracy Now, Canadian Broadcasting Corporation, The New Zealand Herald, TV New Zealand, and Arkansas Online.

Controversy 
In June 2019, World Beyond War "was refused permission to place advertisements featuring the slogan 'US troops out of Shannon' on billboards in Limerick during Donald Trump's visit to Ireland." These billboards would have supplemented World Beyond War's three-day annual #NoWar2019 conference in Limerick, Island, which focused on calls by Irish activists and leaders to end the use of Shannon Airport as a military base for foreign aircraft.

References

External links 

 Official website

Peace movements
International Campaign to Abolish Nuclear Weapons
Organizations based in Charlottesville, Virginia
2014 establishments in the United States
Organizations established in 2014
International organizations based in the United States